is a retired Japanese baseball outfielder. He played for the Chunichi Dragons between 2019 and 2022. He is currently a YouTuber.

On 25 October 2018, Takino was selected as the 6th draft pick for the Chunichi Dragons at the 2018 NPB Draft and on 8 November signed a provisional contract with a ¥30,000,000 sign-on bonus and a ¥7,200,000 yearly salary.

Upon being officially unveiled by the Dragons, Kaname commented that he wanted to be a 3-tool player like new team-mate Yohei Oshima.

References

1996 births
Living people
Baseball people from Mie Prefecture
Japanese baseball players
Nippon Professional Baseball pitchers
Chunichi Dragons players
People from Mie Prefecture